Sakurauchi (written: 櫻内) is a Japanese surname. Notable people with the surname include:

, Japanese footballer
, Japanese politician
, Japanese politician

Fictional characters
, a character from the media-mix project Love Live! Sunshine!!

Japanese-language surnames